Jim McFarlane (15 September 1876 – 21 May 1955) was an Australian rules footballer who played with Carlton in the Victorian Football League (VFL).

Notes

External links 		
		
John McFarlane's profile at Blueseum		
 
				
		
1876 births		
1955 deaths
Australian rules footballers from Victoria (Australia)		
Carlton Football Club players